Patrick Suffo Kengné (born 17 January 1978) is a Cameroonian former professional footballer who played as a striker.

Club career
Suffo was born in Ebolowa, Cameroon. He played in France, England, Spain and the United Arab Emirates before joining Norwegian team Odd Grenland in 2005. His form immediately helped Odd Grenland climb away from the relegation zone. In October of that year he was supposed to sign a contract with rivals, Vålerenga, but he did not. During February 2006 he signed a short-term contract with Israeli team Maccabi Petah Tikva but was subsequently released at the end of this period.

His career was littered with disciplinary problems; whilst at French club Nantes he was banned from playing for eight months for lashing out at a referee.

At Sheffield United Suffo was part in a 21-man mass brawl during the First Division game dubbed as the Battle of Bramall Lane against West Bromwich Albion on 16 March 2002. This game had to be abandoned as Sheffield United were reduced to six players due to three red cards and two injuries. Suffo was one of the three who were sent off as he clashed heads with one of the opposition players. Afterwards, he was told that he had no future with the club and in April Suffo was sent to Spanish Second Division side Numancia on loan for the remainder of the season. In May he received a £3,000 fine and was banned for three games in addition to a three-match suspension already served for his dismissal.

In September 2007, he trialled with Scottish side Dundee United.

On 22 July 2008, Suffo featured in a pre-season friendly for League One side Walsall against Aston Villa. He scored in this game to add to the two goals he notched the previous week in a game against Worcester City.

In November 2008, Suffo signed a "pay as you play" deal with Wrexham, making his debut as a substitute during a 1–0 defeat to Kidderminster Harriers. His first goal for the club came in his second appearance when he converted a penalty during a 2–1 win over Kettering Town.

Suffo signed for Coventry United of the Midland Football League Division Two in August 2014. He made his debut playing the full 90 minutes against Paget Rangers in a 3–2 Coventry United win on 16 August 2014. He has since become a player/assistant manager for the club after the departure of Shamir Alam.

International career
Suffo played at international level for the Cameroon national team, won the gold medal for football at the 2000 Olympic Games in Sydney, Australia and played in the 2002 FIFA World Cup in South Korea and Japan, where he was sent off in the final group game against Germany. He was also part of the Cameroon team who won the 2002 African Cup of Nations, scoring a penalty during the shootout in the final as they beat Senegal.

Honours
Nantes
 Coupe de France: 1999
 Trophée des Champions: 1999

Cameroon
 Gold Medal: 2000 Olympic Games
 African Cup of Nations: 2002

References

External links
 
  Voetbal International
Profile on Wrexham website

1978 births
Living people
People from Ebolowa
Cameroonian footballers
Association football forwards
Cameroon under-20 international footballers
Cameroon international footballers
1998 African Cup of Nations players
2002 African Cup of Nations players
Cameroonian expatriate footballers
Olympic footballers of Cameroon
Olympic gold medalists for Cameroon
Footballers at the 2000 Summer Olympics
2002 FIFA World Cup players
La Liga players
Israeli Premier League players
Ligue 1 players
Eliteserien players
Segunda División B players
Coventry City F.C. players
Sheffield United F.C. players
FC Nantes players
Odds BK players
Maccabi Petah Tikva F.C. players
F.C. Ashdod players
CD Numancia players
CD Puertollano footballers
FC Barcelona Atlètic players
Dubai CSC players
Al Hilal SFC players
Wrexham A.F.C. players
Coventry Alvis F.C. players
Coventry United F.C. players
Olympic medalists in football
Expatriate footballers in France
Expatriate footballers in England
Expatriate footballers in Spain
Expatriate footballers in Saudi Arabia
Expatriate footballers in the United Arab Emirates
Expatriate footballers in Norway
Expatriate footballers in Israel
Expatriate footballers in Wales
Expatriate footballers in Malaysia
Cameroonian expatriate sportspeople in France
Cameroonian expatriate sportspeople in Wales
Cameroonian expatriate sportspeople in Spain
Cameroonian expatriate sportspeople in Saudi Arabia
Cameroonian expatriate sportspeople in Norway
Cameroonian expatriate sportspeople in Israel
Cameroonian expatriate sportspeople in Malaysia
Cameroonian expatriate sportspeople in the United Arab Emirates
Medalists at the 2000 Summer Olympics
UAE Pro League players
Saudi Professional League players
Cameroonian expatriate sportspeople in England